Peter West may refer to:

Peter West (1920-2003), BBC presenter and sports commentator
Peter West (footballer) (1931-2010), Australian sports player
Peter West (physicist), British supersymmetry scientist